The following is a timeline of the history of the municipality of Bern, Switzerland.

Prior to 19th century

 2nd-3rd century CE - Roman settlement abandoned.
 1191 - Bern set up as military outpost by Berthold V, Duke of Zähringen.
 1218 - Bern becomes a free imperial city of the Holy Roman Empire.
 1219 - Zytglogge (tower) built.
 1223 - Theto von Ravensburg becomes .
 1256 - Käfigturm (tower) built.
1259 - First mention of Jews in Bern.
 1268 - Nydegg Castle demolished (approximate date).
 1270 - Felsenburg (castle) built (approximate date).
 1285 -  (church) built.
 1289 - April: Battle of Schosshalde takes place; Bern successfully resisted Rudolph of Hapsburg.
 1298
 Bern allies with Biel, Murten, and Solothurn.
 Bern expands to include Bolligen, Muri, Stettlen, and Vechigen.
 1331-1333 - Gümmenenkrieg (Fribourg-Bern war).
 1339 - Battle of Laupen.
 1345 -  (tower) built.
 1346
 Black Death plague.
 Äussere Neustadt area developed.
 Christoffelturm (tower) and Nydeggkirche (church) built.
1348-49 - Pogroms and persecution of the Jews in Bern following the Black Death.
 1353 - Canton of Bern joins the Swiss Confederacy.
 1380 - Public clock installed (approximate date).
 1383-1384 - Burgdorferkrieg (Kyberg-Bern war) takes place in the County of Burgundy.
 1406 - Construction begins of current Town hall of Bern.
 1417 - Bern Town Hall (town hall) built.
 1421 - Bern Munster construction begins.
 1430 - Konrad Justinger writes Chronik der Stadt Bern, a history of the city.
 1470 - Tschachtlanchronik (Bern history) compiled.
 1489 - Untertorbrücke (bridge) built.
 1494 -  (church) rebuilt.
 1513 - Town begins to keep bears in the Bärenplatz.
 1525 - Printing press in operation.
 1528 - .
 1530 - Astronomical clock installed in the Zytglogge.
 1532 -  adopted.
 1543 - Gerechtigkeitsbrunnen (Bern) (fountain) erected on Gerechtigkeitsgasse.
 1544 - Simsonbrunnen (fountain) erected.
 1546 - Fountains Anna-Seiler-Brunnen (on Marktgasse) and Pfeiferbrunnen (on Spitalgasse) erected.
 1573 - Munster construction ends.
 1615 -  (prison) in operation.
 1700 - Population: 14,219.
 1718 -  (granary) built.
 1729 - Church of the Holy Ghost, Bern rebuilt.
 1752 - Erlacherhof (mansion) built.
 1759 -  (scientific society) founded.
 1798 - 5 March: Battle of Grauholz takes place in canton; French in power.
 1799 - Stämpfli (publisher) in business.

19th century

 1803 - City library active.
 1815 - Bernischen Musikgesellschaft (music society) founded.
 1817 -  (government building) rebuilt.
 1818 - Population: 18,997.
 1830 - Eidgenössisches Schützenfest held in Bern.
 1832
 Karl Zeerleder becomes mayor.
 Canton becomes administratively independent of city.
 1834 - University of Bern established.
 1837 - Population: 24,362.
 1844 - Nydeggbrücke (bridge) built.
 1846 
Jews granted freedom of establishment in the canton.
 founded.
 1848 - Bern becomes capital of Switzerland.
 1850
 Der Bund newspaper begins publication.
 Population: 29,670 in city; 407,765 in canton.
 1851 -  (bridge) built.
 1857 - Federal Palace of Switzerland and Bärengraben (bear pit) built.
 1858
 Bern railway station opens.
  founded.
 1863 - Bernischen Juristenverein (lawyers' association) founded.
 1864 - Catholic Church of St. Peter and Paul, Bern built.
 1868 -  in business.
 1874
 International  (postal union meeting) held in Bern; "Treaty concerning the formation of a General Postal Union" signed.
 Christian Catholic Church of Switzerland headquartered in Bern.
 1877 - Bern Symphony Orchestra established.
 1879 - Conche machine invented by chocolate maker Rodolphe Lindt.
 1880
  oppidum ruins discovered near city.
 Population: 44,087 in city; 471,991 in canton.
 1886 - International "Convention for the Protection of Literary and Artistic Works" signed in city.
 1888 -  founded.
 1891
 August: 700th anniversary of city founding.
  founded.
 1893
 June: Labour unrest.
  (church) built.
 Frauenkomitee Bern founded.
 1894 - Bern Historical Museum built.
 1900
  (public transit operator) and  established.
 Population: 64,227.

20th century

 1902 - Federal Palace of Switzerland building expanded.
 1903 - Albert Einstein moves into Einsteinhaus on Kramgasse.
 1905
 St. Paul's Church, Bern built.
 Akademischer Alpenclub Bern (hiking club) formed.
 1906
 "International Convention respecting the Prohibition of the Use of White (Yellow) Phosphorus in the Manufacture of Matches" signed in Bern.
 Anglican St Ursula's Church, Berne built.
 1910
 Eidgenössisches Schützenfest and Swiss Aviation Exhibition held.
 Population: 90,937 in city; 578,381 in canton.
 1914 -  (national exposition) held in Bern.
 1915 - March: International socialist anti-war women's conference held in Bern.
 1918
  park now belongs to city.
  (publisher) in business.
 1919
 Bümpliz becomes part of city.
 February: Second International conference held in Bern.
 1920 -  (church) built.
 1928 - Schweizeische Ausstellung für Frauenarbeit (women's rights event) held in Bern.
 1929
 Bern Aerodrome begins operating.
  airline headquartered in Bern.
 1930 - Population: 111,783 in city; 623,665 in canton.
 1933 - Bern Trial begins.
 1936 - National Party of Farmers, Traders and Independents headquartered in Bern.
 1939
 Tierpark Dählhölzli (zoo) opens.
 Berner Zeitschrift für Geschichte und Heimatkunde (history journal) in publication.
 1940 - Trolleybus begins operating.
1941- 1943 – The Bern group (Lados group) operates secretly to rescue Jews from the Holocaust.
 1947 - Städtische Verkehrsbetriebe Bern (public transit operator) established.
 1949
  founded.
 1950 - Population: 146,499 in city; 731,550 in canton.
 1951 - Burgerbibliothek of Berne (public library) foundation established.
 1955 - February: The Romanian embassy is seized.
 1963 - Camerata Bern founded.
 1969 - Szeemann's art exhibit "provokes a national scandal."
 1970 - Population: 162,405 in city; 901,706 in canton.
 1977
 Gurtenfestival of music begins.
 Albert Einstein Society founded.
 1979
 French-speaking Canton of Jura secedes from mostly German-speaking Canton of Bern.
 Berner Zeitung (newspaper) begins publication.
 1982 - 6 September: Polish embassy occupied.
 1983 - Old City of Bern designated an UNESCO World Heritage Site.
 1984 - Regional Transport Bern-Solothurn established.
 1990 - March: Demonstration against federal government keeping secret files on citizens.
 1993 - Klaus Baumgartner becomes mayor.
 1995 
Jewish religious community of Bern recognised under public law.
Bern S-Bahn railway in operation.
 2000 - Population: 128,634 in city; 957,197 in canton.

21st century

 2002 - House of Religions founded.
 2004 -  begins.
 2005
 Paul Klee Centre built.
 Alexander Tschäppät becomes mayor.
 2007
 4 August:  bombing.
 October: Political unrest.
 2008 - June: UEFA Euro 2008 Group C football contest takes place in Bern.
 2009 - Bärengraben opens.
 2013 - Population: 137,980.

See also
 History of Bern
 List of mayors of Bern
 List of cultural property of national significance in Switzerland: Bern
 Timelines of other municipalities in Switzerland: Basel, Geneva, Zürich

References

This article incorporates information from the German Wikipedia and French Wikipedia.

Bibliography
in English
 
 
 

in German
 
  (fulltext)
  1981-1987 (fulltext)
 
  (fulltext)

External links

  1995–present

 
Bern
Switzerland history-related lists
Years in Switzerland
Bern